The Erongo Battery Energy Storage System, also Erongo BESS, is a planned  battery energy storage system installation in Namibia. The BESS, the first of its kind in the country and in the Southern African region, will be capable of providing 72MWh of clean energy to the Namibian grid.

Location
The geographical coordinates of this location are:21°29'49.0"S, 16°01'40.0"E (Latitude:-21.496944; Longitude:16.027778).

Overview
The BESS station has storage capacity of 58 megawatts. Its design allows for a discharge capacity of 72MWh of energy into the Namibian grid. The BESS is expected to store "locally generated renewable power as well as electricity imported from the Southern African Power Pool (SAPP)". The electricity will be stored at off-peak times, when it is cheaper. The stored energy can then be discharged "during peak times".

The intended benefits include (a) stabilization of NamPower's grid (b) act as a back-up, if and when existing generation facilities fail (c) reduce the cost of electricity fed through the SAPP.

Developers
The BESS station is under development by the Namibia Power Corporation (Pty) Limited, who own the station. The development receives support (financial and technical) from the German State-Owned Investment and Development Bank (KfW). In December 2021, KfW made a grant of €20 million towards the development of this project, estimated at 80 percent of total cost. NamPower is expected to contribute about 20 percent of the cost and pay any outstanding taxes not covered by the KfW grant.

See also

 List of power stations in Namibia
 Battery storage power station
 Balama Solar Power Station

References

External links
 NamPower gets N$400m battery system grant As of 21 December 2021.

Power stations in Namibia
Erongo Region
Renewable energy power stations in Namibia